This is a list of notable people born at sea.

References 

 
sea
Born at sea